Frank Ross may refer to:

Sportspeople
Frank Ross (Scottish footballer) (born 1998), for Aberdeen FC
Frank Ross (Australian footballer) (1900–1975), Australian rules footballer for South Melbourne

Fictional characters
Frank Ross, protagonist of the British miniseries Out
Frank Ross, hero of the film Each Dawn I Die, played by James Cagney

Others
 Frank Ross (Scottish politician) (born 1959), lord provost of Edinburgh (2017-present)
Frank Elmore Ross (1874–1960), American astronomer and physicist
Frank F. Ross (1867–1931), U.S. Army soldier and recipient of the Medal of Honor
Frank Mackenzie Ross (1891–1971), lieutenant governor of British Columbia, Canada
Frank Ross (producer) (1904–1990), film producer and screenwriter
Frank Ross (born 1977), real name of rapper Nitty